Lotus Long (born Lotus Pearl Shibata, July 18, 1909 – September 14, 1990) was an Asian-American film actress.

Early life
Long was born in New Jersey to a father of Japanese ancestry and a mother of Hawaiian ancestry. She came to Southern California during the 1920s to act in Hollywood films and usually portrayed ethnic Asian female characters in supporting roles. She used the name Lotus Long for stage and film. Due to her professional surname, people generally assumed that she was of Chinese ancestry. During World War II she used this name to avoid incarceration in American internment camps with other persons of Japanese ancestry, which included both legal permanent residents and American citizens.

Career
She appeared in the MGM docudrama Eskimo (1933) as wife of the main character and under the stage name Lotus Long in the 1934 movie The Mysterious Mr. Wong and 1939's Mr. Wong in Chinatown. She also starred alongside Keye Luke in Phantom of Chinatown as Win Len, Dr. Benton's secretary.

She also was credited under the name Karen Sorrell in the movies Flight into Nowhere (1938), starring Jack Holt and Mysterious Mr. Moto (1938), starring Peter Lorre. She was uncredited  in the movie The Real Glory (1939), starring Gary Cooper and David Niven.

One of her more infamous roles was Tokyo Rose in Lew Landers' movie Tokyo Rose (1946), which starred Keye Luke, Edwin Luke, Richard Loo, Byron Barr, and Osa Massen.

Long had a writing and producing credit for the film The Tahitian (1956) made with her husband James Knott. The Tahitian was filmed on location with a largely native cast.

Legacy
She was a pioneer for future  Asian-American actresses in film  and also a role model. 

In Timothy Tau's short-film bio-pic Keye Luke, Lotus Long is portrayed by Mei Melancon.

References

External links

 
The Tahitian
 

American film actresses
1909 births
1990 deaths
American people of Native Hawaiian descent
American actresses of Japanese descent
American film actors of Asian descent
Actresses from New Jersey
20th-century American actresses